The men's team foil was a fencing event held as part of the Fencing at the 1920 Summer Olympics programme. It was the second appearance of the event, which had been introduced in 1904 but not held in 1908 or 1912.

Eight nations competed.

Rosters

Belgium
 Léon Tom
 Robert Hennet
 Marcel Cuypers
 Fernand de Montigny
 Émile De Schepper
 Charles Crahay
 Marcel Berré
 Charles Pape

Czechoslovakia
 Josef Javůrek
 Antonín Mikala
 Vilém Tvrzský
 František Dvořák

Denmark
 Ivan Osiier
 Georg Hegner
 Ejnar Levison
 Poul Rasmussen
 Kay Schrøder

France
 Lionel Bony de Castellane
 Gaston Amson
 Philippe Cattiau
 Roger Ducret
 André Labatut
 Georges Trombert
 Lucien Gaudin
 Marcel Perrot

Great Britain
 Edgar Seligman
 Roland Willoughby
 Philip Doyne
 Robert Montgomerie
 Evan James
 Cecil Kershaw

Italy
 Tommaso Costantino
 Aldo Nadi
 Nedo Nadi
 Abelardo Olivier
 Oreste Puliti
 Pietro Speciale
 Rodolfo Terlizzi
 Baldo Baldi

Netherlands
 Wouter Brouwer
 Félix Vigeveno
 Salomon Zeldenrust
 Arie de Jong
 Jan van der Wiel

United States
 Henry Breckinridge
 Francis Honeycutt
 Arthur Lyon
 Harold Rayner
 Robert Sears

Results

Semifinals

Final

References

 
 

Fencing at the 1920 Summer Olympics